Human resources is the group of individuals who make up the workforce of an organization.

Human resource may also refer to:
 Human resource management, the field or department that handles the management of an organization's workforce
 Human Resources (audio drama), a Doctor Who audio drama
 Human Resources (film) or Ressources humaines, a French film from 1999 directed by Laurent Cantet
 Human Resource (band), Dutch electronic music band
 The Human Resource, a drum and bass compilation album presented by Dieselboy
 Human Resources (TV series), a spin-off of the American animated sitcom Big Mouth